Xiuli, the Qute Ruoshi Zhujiu Chanyu, was the son of Huxie Shizhu Houti. He succeeded his brother Wujihoushizhudi in 128 AD and ruled until 142 AD.

In 140 AD, the Xiongnu chieftains Wusi, Cheniu, and Yiti rebelled. They raided across the north of the Ordos region and attacked Xiuli's capital at Meiji in Xihe Commandery. The Han general Ma Xu forced them back but they continued to plunder the countryside. The Han court was angry with the predicament and reprimanded Xiuliu for it. Xiuli committed suicide in 142 AD and Cheniu claimed the title of chanyu in the autumn.

Footnotes

References

Bichurin N.Ya., "Collection of information on peoples in Central Asia in ancient times", vol. 1, Sankt Petersburg, 1851, reprint Moscow-Leningrad, 1950

Taskin B.S., "Materials on Sünnu history", Science, Moscow, 1968, p. 31 (In Russian)

Chanyus